Sambal is an Indonesian chilli sauce or paste, typically made from a mixture of a variety of chilli peppers with secondary ingredients such as shrimp paste, garlic, ginger, shallot, scallion, palm sugar, and lime juice. Sambal is an Indonesian loanword of Javanese origin. It originated from the culinary traditions of Indonesia and is also an integral part of the cuisines of Singapore, Malaysia, Brunei, and Sri Lanka. It has also spread through overseas Indonesian populations to the Netherlands and Suriname.

Various recipes of sambals are usually served as hot and spicy condiments for dishes, such as lalab (raw vegetables), ikan bakar (grilled fish), ikan goreng (fried fish), ayam goreng (fried chicken), ayam penyet (smashed chicken), iga penyet (ribs), and various soto soups. There are 212 variants of sambal in Indonesia, with most of them originating in Java.

History 
Sambal is often described as a hot and spicy Indonesian relish. However, its main ingredient, chili pepper of the genus Capsicum, is not native to Southeast Asia, but from the Americas. Common variants used in sambal recipes include Cayenne pepper and bird's eye chili pepper (both varieties of Capsicum annuum). These variants are native to the Western Hemisphere and were introduced to the Indonesian archipelago in the 16th century by Portuguese and Spanish sailors during the Columbian exchange. 

Researchers note that the people of the Maritime Southeast Asia were already familiar with a type of hot and spicy relish prior to the 16th century. A hot spice called  had become a valuable commodity in the Javanese market as early as the ancient Mataram Kingdom era, circa the 10th century. The 14th century Majapahit Javanese Nagarakretagama manuscript mentions  island which is identified as Lombok island, which is also the area that produced a spice called red . In today's modern Javanese, the term  refers to 'chilli pepper', yet the term probably originally referred to a native hot spice prior to the introduction of capsicum. The Indonesian languages' terms for 'chilli pepper' are cabai or cabe, yet the word cabya is mentioned in several ancient inscriptions and texts found in Java from the 10th century CE. Cabya is actually a reference to the Javanese long pepper or Balinese long pepper (Piper retrofractum). Historians suggest that prior to the introduction of Capsicum from the Americas in the 16th century, it was cabya that was widely used and cultivated as a hot spice in Java. Cabya is still used in Java, but the overwhelming popularity of the capsicum plants eventually pushed out cabya consumption until it was only used in traditional herbal medication and in making jamu (Javanese traditional herbal drink). Nowadays, the plant is considered rare. Another historian suggests that it was ginger that was used as a hot spice agent in the ancient form of sambal. Ginger, cabya, and andaliman are among the earliest hot spices used in early sambal-like hot relish, followed by the introduction of pepper circa 12th century from India, and finally the introduction of chili pepper from the Americas in the 16th century.

The Javanese manuscript Serat Centhini (1819–1912) records sixteen sambal variants in Java. The recipe book Mustika Rasa (1967), written and composed by Hartini Sukarno, presented 63 recipes of sambals. In 2017, Murdijati Gardjito, a food researcher from Gadjah Mada University, identified hundreds of variants of sambals in Indonesia; 212 of them have a clear origin, while 43 have an unclear origin. Java has the most of variants with 43 percent of sambal variants, 
Sumatra has 20 percent, Bali and West Nusa Tenggara has 8 percent, and the rest are distributed between Maluku, Kalimantan, and Sulawesi.

Like many culinary introductions and adaptations in the archipelago, over the years this hot and spicy relish branched off into an assorted array of sambal varieties, localised according to regional taste and the availability of the ingredients. Today sambal is a staple of Southeast Asian households, essential in cuisines of Indonesia, Sri Lanka, Malaysia and Singapore.

Preparation and availability 

Traditional sambals are freshly made using traditional tools, such as a stone pestle and mortar. Sambal can be served raw or cooked. There are two main categories of sambals in Indonesia, they are sambal masak (cooked) and sambal mentah (raw). Cooked sambal has undergone a cooking process that resulted in a distinct flavour and aroma, while raw sambal is mixed with additional ingredients and usually consumed immediately. Sambal masak or cooked sambals are more prevalent in western Indonesia, while sambal mentah or raw sambals are more common in eastern Indonesia.

The chilli pepper, garlic, shallot, and tomato are often freshly ground using a mortar, while the terasi or belacan (shrimp paste) is fried or burned first to kill its pungent smell as well as to release its aroma. Sambal might be prepared in bulk, as it can be easily stored in a well-sealed glass jar in the refrigerator for a week to be served with meals as a condiment. However, some households and restaurants insist on making freshly prepared sambal just a few moments prior to consuming to ensure its freshness and flavour; this is known as sambal dadak (lit. 'impromptu sambal' or 'freshly made sambal'). Nevertheless, in most warung and restaurants, most sambal is prepared daily in bulk and offered as a hot and spicy condiment.

Today some brands of prepared, pre-packed, instant or ready-to-use sambal are available in warung, traditional markets, supermarkets, and convenience stores. Most are bottled sambal, with a few brands available in plastic or aluminium sachet packaging. Compared to traditional sambals, bottled instant sambals often have a finer texture, more homogenous content, and thicker consistency, like tomato ketchup, due to the machine-driven manufacturing process. Traditionally made sambals ground in a pestle and mortar usually have a coarse texture and consistency.

Several brands produce bottled sambals, among others are Huy Fong Foods' sambal oelek, Heinz ABC sambal terasi and several variants of sambal Indofood.

Varieties of chili 

The most common kinds of peppers used in sambal are:
 Adyuma, also known as habanero: a very spicy, yellow, and block-shaped pepper.
 Cayenne pepper: a shiny, red, and elongated pepper.
 Madame Jeanette: a yellowlight green, elongated, irregularly shaped pepper.
Green chilli peppers are milder than red ones.
 Cabe taliwang: a pepper spicier than the Bird's eye chilli, similar in spiciness to the naga jolokia, its name is supposedly the origin from which Lombok Island, or "the Island of the Chili", derives its name.

Indonesia 

In the Indonesian archipelago, there are as many as 212 to 300 varieties of sambal. The intensity ranges from mild to very hot. Some varieties include:
Sambal andaliman Similar to sambal lado mudo but with the addition of andaliman pepper.
Sambal asam This is similar to sambal terasi with an addition of tamarind concentrate. Asam means tamarind or sour or acid in Indonesian.
Sambal bajak (badjak) Banten sambal. Chilli (or another kind of red pepper) fried with oil, shallot, garlic, terasi, candlenuts, palm sugar and other condiments. This is darker and richer in flavour than sambal asam.

Sambal balado Minangkabau style sambal. Chilli pepper or green chili is blended together with garlic, shallot, red or green tomato, salt and lemon or lime juice, then sauteed with oil. Minang sambal balado often mixed with other ingredients to create a dish, such as egg, eggplant, shrimp or anchovy.
Sambal bawang Sambal made from sliced shallot, chilli pepper, garlic, shrimp paste and lemon juice.
Sambal belimbing or sambal belimbing wuluh Sambal made of sour tasting belimbing wuluh (Averrhoa bilimbi), can be found in some places in Indonesia, especially in Java and East Nusa Tenggara.
Sambal bengkoang Jicama (bengkoang) sambal, made from the mixture of jicama or replaced with water chestnut, red chillies, garlic, Asian basil, shrimp paste and lemon juice.
Sambal berandal (brandal) A fried sambal made with kemiri nuts, garlic and onion. Sometimes tamarind (asem) or kaffir lime leaves (daun djeruk perut) are added.  
Sambal bongkot A speciality sambal from Bali, sambal with a mixture of sweet, sour, and spicy flavours, made with bongkot or kecombrang flower stems, shallots, chilli, grilled shrimp paste, sugar, salt, and lime juice.

Sambal buah (lit: fruit sambal) Speciality of Palembang, made from the mixture of chilli, shrimp paste, kemang (a type of mango) and pineapple.

Sambal cibiuk A sambal recipe speciality of Cibiuk village, Garut Regency, West Java. It consists of coarsely chopped and ground green bird's eye chilli, green raw tomato, shallot, galangal, lemon basil, shrimp paste and salt.
Sambal colo-colo From Ambon, it consists of chilli, tomato pieces, shallots and lime it has a chiefly sour taste. It is suitable for barbecue dishes, especially fish. Some variations will add butter or vegetable oil to the sambal.

Sambal dabu-dabu Dabu-dabu comes close to the Mexican salsa, it is of Manado origin. It consists of coarsely chopped tomatoes, calamansi or known as lemon cui or jeruk kesturi, shallots, chopped bird's eye chili, red chilli, basil, poured with hot vegetable oil, salt.
Sambal durian or Sambal tempoyak It is made from fermented durian called tempoyak. The fermentation process takes three to five days. The chilli and the tempoyak may be readily mixed or served separately, to cater the individual preference in ratio of chili to tempoyak to determine the scale of hotness. This sambal is available in two varieties: raw and cooked. In the cooked variety, pounded chillies, shallots and lemongrass are stir-fried with anchovies, tempoyak and turmeric leaf (for aroma). Petai (Parkia speciosa) and tapioca shoots are also frequently added. The sweet-sour-hot sambal can be found in Sumatra and Kalimantan (Indonesian Borneo), especially in Palembang and Bengkulu, and also in Malay Peninsula.
Sambal ebi Dried shrimp (ebi) sambal, made from the mixture of dried shrimp, candlenut, galangal, red chillies, shallot, garlic, brown sugar and salt.
Sambal gandaria Freshly ground sambal terasi with shredded gandaria, a kind of tropical fruit native to Southeast Asia.
Sambal goangAn extra hot Sundanese sambal associated with the town of Tasikmalaya, made from the mixture of cayenne pepper, garlic, salt and kencur (Kaempferia galanga).
Sambal goreng Literally means "fried sambal". It is a mix of crisp fried red shallots, red and green chilli, shrimp paste and salt, briefly stir-fried in coconut oil. It can be made into a whole different dish by adding other ingredients, such as sambal goreng ati (mixed with diced liver) or sambal goreng udang (added with small shrimp).
Sambal jenggot Sambal with addition of grated coconut, similar to urap.
Sambal jengkol Freshly ground sambal terasi mixed with sliced fried jengkol, a kind of tropical bean with slightly stinky aroma native to Southeast Asia. Sambal jengkol can be found in Sundanese and Cirebon cuisine.
Sambal kalasan Sometimes also called sambal jawa,  a Javanese stir-fried sambal similar to sambal tumis. It uses a handful of gula jawa palm sugar which gives its dark brown color, tomato, spices and chilli. The overall flavour is sweet, with mild hints of spices and chili.
Sambal kacang A mixture of chilli with garlic, shallot, sugar, salt, crushed fried peanuts, and water. Usually used as condiments for nasi uduk, ketan, or otak-otak. The simple version only employ cabe rawit chilli, crushed fried peanuts, and water.
Sambal kecap A sambal consists of Indonesian kecap manis (sweet soy sauce), red chilli, tomato pieces, shallots and lime, it has a sweet and spicy taste and usually used for barbecue dishes.
Sambal kecombrang A sambal made from kecombrang (Etlingera elatior) flower, mixed with red cayenne pepper, shallot, garlic, salt and lime leaves.

Sambal kemangi Sambal made with a mixture kemangi (Lemon basil) fragrant leaf.
Sambal kemiri This is similar to sambal terasi with addition of candlenuts.
Sambal kenari Sambal made with a mixture of kenari (Canarium ovatum) nut, speciality of Maluku islands.

Sambal lado mudo or sambal ijo Literally a Minangkabau word for "green sambal". It is also known as sambal hijau or sambal ijo, also "green sambal". Sambal lado mudo, a West Sumatran speciality, used green chilli, stir-fried with dried shrimp, red shallots, garlic, and spices. It is less hot compared to common sambals, and has a fresh flavour that complements the richness of Sumatran food.

Sambal lampung A popular variant of slightly sweet chilli, garlic, tomato sambal of Lampung origin, Sumatra. 
Sambal leunca A Sundanese sambal, especially popular in West Java, made with the mixture of red chilli pepper, bird's eye chilli, shallot, shrimp paste and leunca (Solanum nigrum) berries.

Sambal luat Sambal made of the mixture of red chilli pepper, terasi shrimp paste, key lime juice, shallot, scallion, coriander, tomato, salt. Specialty of East Nusa Tenggara province. Usually consumed as a condiment to accompany Se'i smoked pork or beef.
Sambal matah Raw shallot and lemongrass sambal of Bali origin. It contains a lot of finely chopped shallots, chopped bird's eye chilli, lemongrass, cooking oil with a dash of lime juice.
Sambal petai A mixture of red chilli, garlic, shallot, and petai green stinky bean as the main ingredients.

Sambal petis An east Javanese sambal uses chilli, petis (a kind of shrimp paste), peanuts, young banana, herbs and spices.
Sambal pencit/mangga muda Green mango sambal from Central Java. Freshly ground sambal terasi with shredded young unripe mango. This is a good accompaniment to seafood. Pencit means young mango in Indonesian.
Sambal plecing Originating from Lombok island, the sambal consists of Lombok's chili variety and Lombok's lengkare shrimp paste, tomatoes, salt, and lime juice.
Sambal rica rica A hot sambal from Manado region, it uses ginger, chili, lemon and spices. Suitable for barbecue meats and chicken.
Sambal roa Spicy smoked roa fish (halfbeak) sambal from Manado region, North Sulawesi.
Sambal rujak Rujak spicy sauce, made from palm sugar, tamarind, chilli pepper and shrimp paste.
Sambal setan A very hot sambal with Madame Jeanette peppers (red brownish, very sharp). The name literally means "devil's sauce". It is popular in Surabaya.
Sambal taliwang This variant is native to Taliwang, a village near Mataram, Lombok Island, and is made from naga jolokia pepper grown specially in Lombok, garlic and Lombok shrimp paste. A kilogram of naga jolokia pepper is extracted, ground and pressed. This is mixed with ground garlic and shrimp paste, then cooked with vegetable oil.
Sambal tape (tapai) A variant of sambal from Tegal in Central Java that consists of chili pepper, salt and the addition of sour fermented cassava called tapai. Usually served to spice up krupuk crackers or vegetables.
Sambal tauco A Sulawesi sambal, contains the Chinese tauco, lime juice, chilli, brown sugar, and salt.
Sambal terasi A common Indonesian style of sambal. Similar to the Malaysian belacan, but with a stronger flavour, since terasi is more tangy and fermented. Red and green peppers, terasi, sugar, salt, lemon or lime juice (tangy, strong). One version omits the lime juice and has the sambal fried with pounded tomatoes. Popularly eaten raw. Alternate spelling in the Netherlands: trassi or trassie.
Sambal teri lado A Padang speciality, sambal is made using chilli pepper, tomato, shallot, spices, and mixed with salted ikan teri (anchovy). The sambal is stir fried and similar to Malay sambal ikan.

Sambal tomat Similar to sambal tumis but with the addition of crushed tomato and sugar. It can be served as fresh sambal or stirred sambal. The tomato is stir fried along with the other ingredients until a paste-like consistency. The overall taste is hot and sweet, it is a good mix with lalapan. For very young children, sambal tomat sometimes uses very little or no chilli at all; it is regarded as one of the first steps in introducing children to the taste of Indonesian sambal.

Sambal tuktuk A traditional hot and spicy condiments typically served in Batak cuisine of Batak people, native of Tapanuli region, North Sumatra, Indonesia. The ingredients to make sambal tuktuk is similar to other chili sauce ingredients, distinguished by the use of andaliman (Sichuan pepper). It is often served as tuktuk aso-aso, being mixed with dried fish called aso-aso (a type of dried and preserved mackerel), but sometimes aso-aso fish is replaced with fresh anchovy.
Sambal tumis Chilli fried with belacan shrimp paste, onions, garlic, tamarind juice. Tumis means 'stir fry'. Often the cooking oil is re-mixed with the sambal. It may be mixed with other ingredients to produce dishes such as sambal kangkong, sambal cumi (squid) and sambal telur (egg).
Sambal tumpang Javanese sambal made from the mixture of chili pepper, other spices and semangit (old and pungent) tempeh.
Sambal udang bawang A speciality sambal from Surabaya. It is one of Indonesia's super hot sambal. It used simple ingredients, such as chili pepper, shallot, garlic, asam jawa (tamarind) and coconut oil. People of Surabaya often called it Njaluk Sambal, as they eat it with fragrant steamed white rice.

Sambal ulek (oelek) Raw chilli paste (bright red, thin and sharp-tasting). Can be used as the base for making other sambals or as an ingredient for other cuisines. Some types of this variant call for the addition of salt or lime into the red mixture. Oelek is the old pre-1972 Indonesian spelling which in has since become ulek. The pronunciation has not changed and is in line with Malay pronunciation. Nevertheless, most suppliers use outdated spelling. Cobek is Indonesian special stoneware derived from the common village basalt stone kitchenware still ubiquitous in kitchens, particularly in Java. The cobek is a mortar shaped like a hybrid of a dinner and soup-plate with an old, cured bamboo root or stone pestle (ulek or ulekan) employed in an ulek manner: a crushing and twisting motion (like using a screwdriver) for crushing lime leaves, chilies, peppers, shallots, peanuts, and other kinds of ingredients.
Sambal stroberi A sambal made with strawberries originated from Bandung, West Java. Usually served to accompany breaded fish cutlet.

Sambal uyah-lombok A kind of sambal which is only made from raw chilli and salt. Very simple and easy to make, and usually be eaten with steamed rice and fried foods like fried chicken.

Malaysia 
Sambal belacan A Malay style sambal. Fresh chillies are pounded together with toasted shrimp paste (belacan) in a stone mortar to which sugar and lime juice are added. Originally, limau kesturi or calamansi lime, is used but since this is scarce outside of Southeast Asia, normal lime is used as a replacement. Tomatoes are optional ingredients. Sometimes, sweet-sour mangoes or equivalent local fruits are also used. It can be eaten with cucumbers or ulam (leafy herbs) in a meal of rice and other dishes. A Malaysian-Chinese version is to fry belacan with chili.
Sambal jeruk Green or red pepper with kaffir lime. In Malaysia, it is called cili (chili) jeruk (pickle). Sometimes vinegar and sugar are substituted for lime. Used as a condiment with fried rice and noodle-based dishes.

Sambal tempoyak This sambal exists in two varieties: raw and cooked. Raw sambal tempoyak is prepared from fresh chilis pounded together with dried anchovies and served with fermented durian (tempoyak). The sambal and the tempoyak may be readily mixed or served separately, so that the person eating can determine the ratio of sambal to tempoyak that they want (tempoyak has a sweet-sour taste that offsets the hotness of the chilli). In the cooked variety, pounded chilis, shallots, and lemongrass are stir-fried with anchovies, tempoyak and turmeric leaf (for aroma). Commonly found in Pahang and Perak of Peninsular Malaysia, sambal tempoyak could be found also at Sumatra. Petai (Parkia speciosa) and tapioca shoots are also frequently added.
Sambal Kicap Made from mixed of sweet soya sauce, shallot, garlic, bird's eye chili for any fried dishes especially for fried banana, fried tempeh or condiment for soto and bihun soup. 
Sambal Goreng Dishes consist of tempeh, anchovies, peanut fried together with sambal until dried.
Sambal Kacang Condiment for satay.
Sweet Sambal This is sambal made from dried chillies, fresh chilies, belacan and gula Melaka (palm sugar) as main ingredients. Sweet sambal is traditionally served with nasi lemak and also side dishes fried crispy anchovies, toasted peanuts, boiled egg and cucumber.

Sri Lanka 

Sambols in Sri Lanka differ from those originating in Malaysia and Indonesia, in that they are generally made from uncooked ingredients, such as fresh chillies, shallots, coconut, garlic, which are then ground with a mortar and pestle  and mixed with a citric acid, such as lime or lemon juice. They resemble a Mexican salsa or Laotian jaew.

Seeni sambol This is a hot/sweet sambal of the Sri Lankan cuisine that includes onion, crumbled Maldive fish, and spices as its main ingredients. Its name, also spelled as "sini sambol" or "seeni sambal", is derived from the local word for "sugar".

Pol sambol/Thengkai sambal This is a sambal made of scraped coconut (pol and thengkai mean coconut in Sinhala and Tamil, respectively), onion, green chilli, red chilli powder, and lime juice as its main ingredients. Sometimes, crumbled Maldive fish is also added, and tomatoes can be used instead of lime juice for flavor.

Lunumiris (Katta sambal) This is a red onion sambal. The name "lunu miris" can be literally translated as "salt chili" and is a paste of red chilli pounded with sea salt. A widespread derivative is katta sambal, which adds onions, crumbled Maldive fish, salt, and lime juice to the chilli-and-salt mixture.

Vaalai kai sambal This is sambal made of boiled and mashed plantain, scraped coconut, chopped green chillies and onion, salt and lime juice. Vaalai kai means unripe plantain in Sri Lankan Tamil.

Dishes 

Sambal can also be used as an ingredient to a dish, which uses a large amount of chili peppers. In Padang cuisine, any dishes started with balado- (lit: with chili pepper) indicate the sambal-mixed dish. Dishes bearing the word sambal include:

 Sambal lalab Sambal served with lalab (assorted of fresh vegetables), consumed as a dip dressing for salad. A Sundanese dish.

 Sambal sotong or Sambal cumi (with cuttlefish)
 Sambal udang kering (with dried prawns), also known in Penang as "Sambal Hae Bee"
 Sambal lengkong (with ikan parang/wolf herring).
 Sambal belut (with eel). An Indonesian dish.
 Sambal goreng ati (with cow's or chicken liver, potato, and sometimes petai). An Indonesian dish.
 Sambal goreng teri kacang (with anchovy and peanuts). An Indonesian dish.
 Sambal goreng kering tempe (with tempeh). An Indonesian dish.
 Sambal goreng krecek (with cow or water buffalo skin cracker). A Javanese dish.

 Sambal goreng udang or sambal shrimp (with fresh shrimp), also known as udang balado. A Minang dish.
 Sambal jamur (with oyster mushroom). An Indonesian dish.
 Sambal radio a traditional dish from Sarawak, it is an omelette mixed with fried belacan and anchovies.
 Sambal ikan a Malay-style dish prepared from fish and spices and cooked until the fish loses its shape. Available in varieties, some are in the shape of dry fish floss known as serunding ikan, and some are moist such as sambal ikan bilis (anchovies) or sambal ikan tongkol (skipjack tuna).
Sambal daging/serunding daging A Malay style sambal prepared from meat and spices and cooked for more than 4 hours until the meat loses its shape, similar to meat floss.

See also 

 Balado, Minang style sambal goreng
 Hot sauce, also known as chili sauce or pepper sauce
 Salsa
 Indonesian cuisine
 Malaysian cuisine
 Nam phrik, the Thai equivalent of sambal
 Singaporean cuisine
 Peranakan cuisine
 Filipino cuisine

References 

Anchovy dishes
Bruneian cuisine
Chili sauce and paste
Dips (food)
Food paste
Indonesian condiments
Indonesian words and phrases
Malay cuisine
Malay words and phrases
Malaysian condiments
Philippine cuisine
Singaporean cuisine
Sri Lankan condiments
Surinamese cuisine
Spicy foods